45 rpm is a 2019 Spanish drama television series created by Ramón Campos and Gema R. Neira that originally aired on Antena 3 from March 18 to May 30, 2019. Starring Carlos Cuevas, Guiomar Puerta and Iván Marcos, the plot revolves around the establishment of a music label in the 1960s and the people involved inside the complex music industry.

Cast
Carlos Cuevas as Robert Aguirre
 as Maribel Campoy
 as Guillermo Rojas
Israel Elejalde as Pedro Zabala
 as Tino
Diana Gómez as Clara Aguirre
Silvana Navas as Nines
Eudald Font as Diego Salinas
 as Elisa
Vito Sanz as Ignacio Betancourt
Pau Vinyals as Chimo
Pere Ponce as Alberto
Héctor Black as Paco
Marina San José as Ángeles Costa
 as D. Alfredo
Kimberley Tell as Fanny
 as Eugenio Vidal
Guim Puig as Juan
Esmeralda Moya as Celia Vera
Fanny Gautier as Feli
Héctor Colorado as Jorge Rojas
 as Gary
José Luis Hijón as Santi
Nieve de Medina as Silvia
 as Salvador Quintana
Amaia Aberasturi as Carmen
Edgar Moreno as Valentín Quesada
Javier Ibarz as a doctor

Episodes

Release
45 rpm premiered on March 18, 2019, on Antena 3. The original broadcasting run ended on May 30, 2019, in what it was one of the biggest blunders in the history of Spanish private television channels, with the series averaging a 4.3% audience share. It was released on Netflix on August 16, 2019.

References

External links
 

2010s Spanish drama television series
Spanish-language television shows
Television series set in the 1960s
2019 Spanish television series debuts
Antena 3 (Spanish TV channel) network series
Television series by Bambú Producciones
2019 Spanish television series endings